Oby Kechere  popularly known as Ms Koi Koi, is a Nigerian actress and film director.  She comes from Mbaise in Imo State, Nigeria.

Oby Kachere is a Nigerian actress, film director and producer. She is from Mbaise town in Imo State, Nigeria. She joined the Nigerian film industry otherwise called Nollywood in 2002.

References

Living people
Year of birth missing (living people)
Actresses from Imo State
Nigerian film directors
Nigerian women film producers
Nigerian women film directors
Igbo actresses
Nigerian film producers
People from Mbaise
21st-century Nigerian actresses